"Save Me (Wake Up Call)" is a song by the San Diego-based rock band Unwritten Law, released as the first single from the band's 2005 album Here's to the Mourning. It was written by singer Scott Russo along with Aimee Allen and Linda Perry, and was produced by Perry and Sean Beavan. It became the second highest-charting single of the band's career, reaching #5 on Billboard's Modern Rock Tracks chart.

Track listing

Personnel

Band
Scott Russo - lead vocals
Steve Morris - lead guitar, backing vocals
Rob Brewer - rhythm guitar, backing vocals
Pat "PK" Kim - bass guitar
Tony Palermo - drums

Additional musicians
Ben Rosen - programming

Production
Sean Beavan – producer, engineer, mixing
Linda Perry – producer of "Save Me (Wake Up Call)" (with Beavan)
Critter and Zach Barnhorst – engineers
Zach Barnhorst, Jay Groin, James Murray, and Alex Pavlides – assistant engineers
Brain Gardener – mastering

References

2005 singles
Unwritten Law songs
Songs written by Linda Perry
Music videos directed by Brett Simon
Animated music videos
2005 songs
Songs written by Aimee Allen